Aidan Yüçel Sezer (born 24 June 1991) is a Turkish-Australian professional rugby league footballer who plays as a  and  for the Leeds Rhinos in the Betfred Super League.

He previously played for the Gold Coast Titans, Canberra Raiders in the NRL and  the Huddersfield Giants in the Super League. Sezer has played for the Indigenous All Stars and New South Wales City sides.

Background
Sezer was born in Bankstown, New South Wales, Australia to a Turkish father, Yüçel, and an Indigenous Australian mother.

Sezer played his junior football for the East Hills Bulldogs before being signed by the Canterbury-Bankstown Bulldogs. Sezer played in the Bulldogs Toyota Cup team in 2010–2011, scoring over 300 points. On 31 August 2010, Sezer was named at five-eighth in the 2010 NYC Team of the Year. At the end of 2011, Sezer signed with the Gold Coast Titans after a lack of first-grade opportunities at the Bulldogs.

Playing career

2012
In round 7 of the 2012 NRL season, Sezer made his NRL debut for the Gold Coast Titans against the Manly-Warringah Sea Eagles at five-eighth and scored a try in the Titans 26–14 upset win at Brookvale Oval. In December 2012, Sezer re-signed with the Gold Coast on a two-year contract. Sezer finished his debut year in the NRL with him playing in 18 matches, scoring four tries, kicking seven goals and kicking one field goal for the Gold Coast Titans in the 2012 NRL season. On 4 December 2012, Sezer re-signed with the Gold Coast for three years until the end of the 2015 NRL season.

2013
On 9 February 2013, Sezer played for the Indigenous All Stars team in the 2013 All Stars match against the NRL All Stars off the interchange bench in the Indigenous Team 32–6 win at Suncorp Stadium. Sezer finished the 2013 NRL season with him playing in 22 matches, scoring one try, kicking 75 goals and kicking two field goals for the Gold Coast Titans.

2014
In round 10 against the Brisbane Broncos at Suncorp Stadium, Sezer suffered a pectoral muscle injury in the Gold Coast's 22–8 loss which made him miss three months of football, until making a return in Round 22 against the Sydney Roosters at SFS which the Gold Coast lost the match 26–18. Sezer finished the Gold Coast Titans 2014 NRL season with him playing in 13 matches, scoring four matches, kicking 23 goals and kicking one field goal in an injury riddled year.

2015
On 20 January, Sezer was named in the Gold Coast 2015 NRL Auckland Nines squad. On 10 April, he signed a three-year contract with the Canberra Raiders starting in 2016. He finished his last year with the Gold Coast, having played in 18 matches, scoring three tries, kicking 51 goals and one field goal.

2016
In round 1 of the 2016 NRL season, Sezer made his club debut for the Canberra Raiders against the Penrith Panthers, playing at halfback and scoring two tries in the club's 30–22 win at Canberra Stadium. On 8 May 2016, Sezer played for City Origin against Country Origin, where he played at five-eighth and kicked 6 goals in the 44–30 win in Tamworth. Sezer finished the 2016 NRL season with him playing in 24 matches, scoring 5 tries and kicking 5 goals in his first year with the Canberra club.

2017
In February 2017, Sezer was selected in Canberra's 2017 Auckland Nines squad. On 10 February 2017, Sezer played for the Indigenous All Stars against the World All Stars in the 2017 All Stars match, playing off the interchange bench in the 34–8 win at Hunter Stadium. In round 5 against the Parramatta Eels, Sezer played his 100th NRL career match in the 30–18 win at Canberra Stadium. Sezer finished the 2017 NRL season with him playing in all of the Raiders 24 matches, scoring 4 tries and kicking 12 goals. Sezer and his halves partner Blake Austin were subjected to criticism at the end of the season for not lifting their game to close out matches and were taking the back seat for hooker Josh Hodgson who did the key playmaking a little too often than they should have.

2018
On 27 June 2018, Sezer extended his contract with the Canberra club to the end of the 2020 NRL season. Sezer finished the 2018 NRL season with him playing in 18 matches, scoring 2 tries, kicking 8 goals and 1 field goal for the Raiders. In October 2018, Sezer alongside Raiders team-mate Emre Guler trained with the Turkey national rugby league team for the 2018 Emerging Nations World Championship matches.

2019
Sezer started the 2019 NRL season as the club's first choice halfback and kicked a field goal in the opening round as Canberra defeated the Gold Coast 21–0.  In round 2, Sezer suffered an oblique injury and was replaced by Sam Williams.  Due to the good form of Canberra and Williams, Sezer was kept in reserve grade to play for Canberra's feeder club side the Mount Pritchard Mounties after recovering from his injury.

In round 23, Sezer played his 150th NRL game in Canberra's 14–18 loss to the Manly-Warringah Sea Eagles at GIO stadium in Canberra. In round 24, Sezer kicked 3 field goals in Canberra's 15–14 win against the Cronulla-Sutherland Sharks at Pointsbet Stadium, including the game winner in golden point extra time.

Sezer played for Canberra in the 2019 NRL Grand Final which was their first decider in 25 years. Canberra would go on to lose the final 14–8 against the Sydney Roosters at ANZ Stadium.

On 28 November, it was announced that Sezer had signed a two-year deal to join Super League side Huddersfield.

2020
Sezer made 16 appearances for Huddersfield in the 2020 Super League season as the club missed out on the finals.

2021
In round 5 of the 2021 Super League season, Sezer scored two tries and kicked two goals as Huddersfield defeated Leeds 14-13 to claim their first win of the year.

On 25 June 2021 he played for the Combined Nations All Stars in their 26-24 victory over England, staged at the Halliwell Jones Stadium, Warrington, as part of England’s 2021 Rugby League World Cup preparation.

On 19 July, it was announced that Sezer would leave Huddersfield at the end of 2021 to take up a two-year deal with eight time Super League Champions Leeds.

2022
In round 1 of the 2022 Super League season, Sezer made his club debut for Leeds in their 22-20 loss against Warrington.

References

External links
Canberra Raiders profile
Raiders profile

1991 births
Living people
Australian Muslims
Australian people of Turkish descent
Australian rugby league players
Australian expatriate sportspeople in England
Burleigh Bears players
Canberra Raiders players
Combined Nationalities rugby league team players
Gold Coast Titans players
Huddersfield Giants players
Indigenous All Stars players
Indigenous Australian rugby league players
Leeds Rhinos players
New South Wales City Origin rugby league team players
Rugby league five-eighths
Rugby league halfbacks
Rugby league players from Sydney
Turkey national rugby league team players
Turkish expatriate sportspeople in England
Turkish rugby league players